"" is the eleventh single by the Japanese rock band Mr. Children.

The song was released as one of the lead-off singles from the album Shinkai on April 10, 1996 on only 500 yen, because its compact disc not contains any B-Sides or Karaoke versions. Like the previous materials, "Hana" also debuted at the number-one on the Japanese Oricon chart, and remained the peak position for a couple of weeks, finally selling more than 1.5 million copies.

The Latin subtitle of the song which means "think about the death" was named after the photo book that made songwriter impressed, which was taken and edited by Shinya Fujiwara.  When the re-recorded version of the song was featured on B-side of a single "Yasashii Uta" released in 2001, its alternative title was omitted.

Track listing

References

1996 singles
Oricon Weekly number-one singles
Mr. Children songs
Songs written by Kazutoshi Sakurai
1996 songs
Toy's Factory singles